K. S. Thennarasu is an Indian politician and former Member of the Legislative Assembly of Tamil Nadu. He was elected to the Tamil Nadu legislative assembly as an All India Anna Dravida Munnetra Kazhagam candidate from Erode Assembly constituency in 2001 and Erode East Assembly constituency in 2016.

Elections contested and positions held

References 

Year of birth missing (living people)
Living people
Tamil Nadu MLAs 2001–2006
Tamil Nadu MLAs 2016–2021
All India Anna Dravida Munnetra Kazhagam politicians